Stuart Elliott Eizenstat (born January 15, 1943) is an American diplomat and attorney. He served as the United States Ambassador to the European Union from 1993 to 1996 and as the United States Deputy Secretary of the Treasury from 1999 to 2001. For many years, and currently (as of 2018) he has served as a partner and Senior Counsel at the Washington, D.C.–based law firm Covington & Burling and as a senior strategist at APCO Worldwide.

Biography

Early life
Stuart E. Eizenstat was born on January 15, 1943, in Chicago and raised in Atlanta; he was an all-city and honorable-mention All-America basketball player in high school. He earned an A.B., cum laude and Phi Beta Kappa, in political science from the University of North Carolina at Chapel Hill where he was a brother of the Alpha Pi chapter of Zeta Beta Tau fraternity. He received his Juris Doctor degree from Harvard Law School in 1967. Eizenstat attended Blue Star Camps in Hendersonville, North Carolina, as a youth.

Career

He served as a law clerk for the Honorable Newell Edenfield of the United States District Court for the Northern District of Georgia.

Eizenstat worked as the issues director of Jimmy Carter's 1970 gubernatorial campaign.

Eizenstat worked on Jimmy Carter's 1976 presidential campaign. He served as his point man in the drafting of the 1976 party platform and headed the issues operations of Carter's campaign.

From 1977 to 1981, he was President Jimmy Carter’s Chief Domestic Policy Adviser, and Executive Director of the White House Domestic Policy Staff. In this role, he was approached by Turkish ambassador Şükrü Elekdağ who told him that "Turkey could no longer guarantee the safety of the Jews in Turkey" if there was any mention of the Armenian genocide in the United States Holocaust Memorial Museum.

In 1983, he wrote for Quarante magazine an article entitled "The Quiet Revolution". He was the first to describe the "feminization of poverty". He was President Bill Clinton's Deputy Secretary of the Treasury (1999–2001), Under Secretary of State for Economic, Business, and Agricultural Affairs (1997–1999), and also served as the Under Secretary of Commerce for International Trade at the International Trade Administration (ITA) from 1996 to 1997.

In 1984, Eizenstat was elected as a fellow of the National Academy of Public Administration.

He has served as the United States Ambassador to the European Union from 1993 to 1996 and as co-chairman of the European-American Business Council (EABC). Additionally, he is a member of the Board of Advisors of the Global Panel Foundation.

Eizenstat led the U.S. delegation at the Third Conference of the Parties in Kyoto, Japan, which concluded by adopting the Kyoto Protocol and military exemptions to emissions controls.

In 2008, the Ambassador Stuart E. Eizenstat Distinguished Professorship in Jewish history and culture was endowed in Eizenstat's honor at the University of North Carolina at Chapel Hill. For his work he has received the Courage and Conscience Award from the Government of Israel, the Knight Commander's Cross (Badge and Star) of the Order of Merit of the Federal Republic of Germany, the French Legion of Honor from the Government of France, and the International Advocate for Peace Award from the Cardozo Journal of Conflict Resolution.

Eizenstat is also a member of the Atlantic Council's Board of Directors.

Holocaust restitution

He has devoted much effort to various aspects of Holocaust Restitution.  This has included partial recompense for Slave and Forced Labor, and most recently in 2018 for the trauma suffered by Kindertransport. It has also included restitution of Holocaust-Era Assets to their original owners or their heirs. Initially, he did this as President Clinton's "Special Representative of the President and Secretary of State on Holocaust-Era Issues." In this position, he took an important leadership role for many nations. He has continued this role as a private citizen. In 1998, he organized the Washington Conference on Holocaust Era Assets, resulting in the Washington Principles on Nazi-Confiscated Art.

He successfully negotiated major agreements with the Swiss, Germans, Austrian and French, and other European countries. This importantly concerned Slave and Forced Labor. It also included life insurance policy payments to heirs of victims of the Nazi Holocaust; and Holocaust Victim Bank Account assets. It also included the return of art-works to their original owners, or their heirs, which had been looted by the Nazis (many such art-works had been acquired at a later date by National or important private museums). One such art-work is Gustav Klimt's "Lady in Gold" which was returned to Maria Altmann. Ambassador Eizenstat has acted on many occasions as a negotiator to gain payments by the current German Government to various other classes of Holocaust Survivors, or their heirs.

Most recently, in 2018, he helped negotiate a symbolic payment of 2,500 Euros to those who had survived the Holocaust by having escaped it by the Kindertransport program, which had been assisted by the British Government. All parties involved agree that there is no way to "make good" to these Holocaust Survivors for the trauma they had suffered, often as very young children, when they had been separated from their parents in 1938 or 1939. Also, their extra trauma when, in 1945 or even later, nearly all of them had discovered that their parents had been murdered by the Nazis - yet this symbolic payment is an important form of official recognition for the extreme trauma they had suffered due to the Nazi Holocaust.

This statement similarly applies to the symbolic payment of 2,500 Euros to Child Holocaust Survivors, negotiated by Child Survivors in 2014 - it too cannot "make good," but it is an official recognition. In fact, for any personal victimization   (murder, imprisonment, slave labor, ghetto, displacement, hiding, etc.) no restitution scheme can make good - but for most of these victimization, the German Government has provided monthly continuing significant Restitution. In general, the German Government has attempted to make meaningful, if partial, restitution. Ambassador Eizenstat has written about his earlier Restitution efforts in his 2009 book Imperfect Justice: Looted Assets, Slave Labor, and the Unfinished Business of World War II (2009). This has been translated into German, French, Czech and Hebrew. (See bibliography, below.) In 2013 Ambassador Eizenstat was appointed by Secretary of State Hillary Rodham Clinton as "Special Advisor for Holocaust Issues." As of 2017, he has remained in this position.

Personal life
He was married to the late Frances Eizenstat and has two sons and eight grandchildren.

Honors
Leo Baeck Medal (2013)

Publications

See also 

Christoph Meili

References

External links 

 Taking on the Unfinished Business of the Twentieth Century
 APCO Worldwide

 https://www.cov.com/en/professionals/e/stuart-eizenstat

|-

|-

|-

|-

|-

1943 births
Ambassadors of the United States to the European Union
American Jews
Clinton administration personnel
Harvard Law School alumni
Jewish American government officials
Knights Commander of the Order of Merit of the Federal Republic of Germany
Living people
People associated with Covington & Burling
Politicians from Atlanta
Politicians from Chicago
Recipients of the Legion of Honour
United States Under Secretaries of Commerce
United States Under Secretaries of State
United States Deputy Secretaries of the Treasury
United States Special Envoys
20th-century American diplomats
Under Secretaries of Commerce for International Trade